Kevin Rosaire Bellemare, known professionally as Roz Bell, is a Canadian singer-songwriter, best known for his hit singles "Yesterday Man" and "Papercut".

His debut album, The First Sunbeams was released by Universal Music in 2007 and garnered two top 20 hits in Canada, earning Roz a Canadian Radio Music Award nomination in 2008. He's since had songs placed in TV shows, such as 90210, films such as Van Wilder, as well as in advertising campaigns for Coca-Cola and Pringles.

Discography

The First Sunbeams EP 
Universal, summer 2007

The First Sunbeams
Universal, September 25, 2007

October 
Enacy Ent., August 4, 2009

Singles 
 "Becoming Strangers"
 "Yesterday Man (I'm So Lonely)"
 "Papercut"
 "Heart Attack"

Awards and nominations
Roz Bell was nominated for a 2008 Canadian Radio Music Award in the Pop category for his songs Yesterday Man and Papercut.

External links
 Roz Bell official site
 Roz Bell webisodes at Dose.ca
 Roz Bell on MySpace
 Roz Bell on CBC Radio 3
 Roz Bell at Virb

Canadian pop singers
Canadian rock singers
Canadian singer-songwriters
Musicians from Ontario
People from East Gwillimbury
Living people
Year of birth missing (living people)